This is a list of Australian Statutory Instruments from 1903.

1903 Commonwealth Of Australia Numbered Acts 
 Supply Act (no. 1) 1903-4 (no. 1, 1903)
 Senate Elections Act 1903 (no. 2, 1903)
 Sugar Rebate Abolition Act 1903 (no. 3, 1903)
 Sugar Bounty Act 1903 (no. 4, 1903)
 Supply Act (no. 2) 1903-4 (no. 5, 1903)
 Judiciary Act 1903 (no. 6, 1903)
 High Court Procedure Act 1903 (no. 7, 1903)
 Naval Agreement Act 1903 (no. 8, 1903)
 Electoral Divisions Act 1903 (no. 9, 1903)
 Supply Act (no. 3) 1903-4 (no. 10, 1903)
 Naturalization Act 1903 (no. 11, 1903)
 Extradition Act 1903 (no. 12, 1903)
 High Court Procedure Amendment Act 1903 (no. 13, 1903)
 Appropriation Act 1903-4 (no. 14, 1903)
 Supplementary Appropriation Act 1901-2 And 1902-3 (no. 15, 1903)
 Appropriation (works And Buildings) Act 1903-4 (no. 16, 1903)
 Supplementary Appropriation (works And Buildings) Act 1901-2 And 1902-3 (no. 17, 1903)
 Rules Publication Act 1903 (no. 18, 1903)
 Commonwealth Public Service Amendment Act 1903 (no. 19, 1903)
 Defence Act 1903 (no. 20, 1903)
 Patents Act 1903 (no. 21, 1903)

See also  
 List of Acts of the Parliament of Australia
 List of Statutory Instruments of Australia

External links 
 1903 Commonwealth of Australia Numbered Act http://www.austlii.edu.au/au/legis/cth/num_act/1903/
 COMLAW Historical Acts http://www.comlaw.gov.au/Browse/ByTitle/Acts/Historical
 COMLAW Select Statutory Instruments http://www.comlaw.gov.au/Browse/ByYearNumber/SelectLIsandStatRules/Asmade/0/

Lists of the Statutory Instruments of Australia
Statutory Instruments